"The Moon and the Sky" is the third single from English band Sade on their sixth studio album, Soldier of Love. It was released on 24 August 2010.

Reception
Frank Guan of Vulture commented "Not even Sade can make the most of every opportunity, as this lofty song proves. Paired with a sad, introverted guitar line, her regret is impossible to mistake."

Charts

References

2010 singles
Sade (band) songs
Songs written by Sade (singer)
Songs written by Stuart Matthewman
2010 songs
2010s ballads
Soul ballads